Woodley station is a station on the G Line of the Los Angeles Metro Busway system.  It is named after adjacent Woodley Avenue, which travels north–south and crosses the east–west busway route. The station is in the Van Nuys neighborhood of Los Angeles, in the San Fernando Valley.

Service

Station Layout

Hours and frequency

Connections 
, the following connections are available:
 Los Angeles Metro Bus: ,

Notable places nearby 
The station is within walking distance of the following notable places: 
Sepulveda Basin Recreation Area
The Japanese Garden
Woodley Park

References

External links

G Line (Los Angeles Metro)
Van Nuys, Los Angeles
Los Angeles Metro Busway stations
Public transportation in the San Fernando Valley
Public transportation in Los Angeles
Bus stations in Los Angeles
2005 establishments in California